The Fitzhugh Snapp Company is a historic commercial building in rural Woodruff County, Arkansas. It is a single-story structure, built out of load-bearing brick, and finished (as of 2005) with diamond-shaped asbestos shingles. A porch shelters the main (east-facing) facade; it is covered by corrugated metal. A parapet above has a panel identifying the building. Built in 1935, it served the rural cotton-farming community until 1981.

The building was listed on the National Register of Historic Places in 2005.

See also
National Register of Historic Places listings in Woodruff County, Arkansas

References

Commercial buildings on the National Register of Historic Places in Arkansas
Commercial buildings completed in 1935
National Register of Historic Places in Woodruff County, Arkansas
1935 establishments in Arkansas
Buildings designated early commercial in the National Register of Historic Places in Arkansas